Spilarctia gianellii is a moth in the family Erebidae. It was described by Charles Oberthür in 1911. It is found in China in Sichuan, Yunnan and Tibet.

References

Moths described in 1911
gianellii